The following tables show the progression of world bests and world records in the 10K run, as recognised by the IAAF. The 10K run was introduced as a world record event in 2003.

Men

World bests (prior to IAAF recognition)

World records
Key:

Women

World bests (prior to IAAF recognition)

World records - races with women only

World records - races with both men and women

References

World bests
World Best Progressions- Road. Association of Road Racing Statisticians. Retrieved 2020-03-04.

World record
10 km